, is a Japanese guitarist, singer-songwriter, arranger and producer. Usually referred to by his stage name "Chachamaru", little is known about his early years and personal life. Besides being a member and collaborator with various bands and musical acts in the 80s and 90s, he is most known as being the lead guitarist and associate music producer for Gackt.

Biography 
Yukihiro "Chachamaru" Fujimura was born in Kyoto Prefecture, Japan, on March 3, 1960. He was a student at the Bukkyo University, a private university with a philosophy based on Pure Land Buddhism.

In 1983, Fujimura was the co-founder, leader vocalist and guitarist of the progressive rock band Gerard. The band were signed to King Records until 1986, when the band disbanded because the label no longer supported progressive music. After a two-year break, he joined Shusei Tsukamoto in forming the progressive/hard rock band Vienna, performing guitar and vocal duties. In the same year they released their first album "Overture". After recording one more album and a live record, Vienna went on a hiatus. In 1989, Fujimura worked as a session guitarist for Minoru Niihara's metal band Ded Chaplin on their first album "Ded Chaplin 1st."

In 1990 he participated in the Gerard reunion for a new recording, although left the band shortly after due to musical differences. Not long after, he joined Minoru Niihara and re-formed Ded Chaplin. Over the next two years, they released two studio albums and a best-of compilation "The Best Works of Ded Chaplin" before disbanding. In 1994 to 1995 he joined Toshi from X Japan on his second studio album "Grace" and on tour as a guitarist and backing vocalist. In the next year, he adopted his stage name "Chachamaru" and joined the sessions of the hard rock band Girl U Need's self-titled album. He also joined the Vienna reunion and released an album with them called "Unknown," before they disbanded once more.

Since the year 2000, Chachamaru has worked with the solo artist Gackt, serving as an associate producer and the lead guitarist for his live band, as well as backing vocalist.

Music style and technique 
As a lead guitarist, Chachamaru is known for his technical playing style and also for his unique tuning. His playing style draws influence from many heavy metal guitarists who came to prominence in the 1970s–80s, with the most obvious being Eddie Van Halen. His musical style varies from progressive rock, metal, soul and blues and features some more experimental playing.

Guitar Legacy 
At the time, Jackson/Charvel luthier Itaru Kanno designed several guitar models for the companies, among them the 27-fretter „Jackson Falcon Custom“ for Chachamaru, a guitar never sold outside Japan. When around 94s Jackson's contract with the Japanese trading company Kyowa-Shokai expired and they opted not to renew their contact with Jackson guitars, Itaru as one of the main designers at the Chushin Gakki factory, in 95s established a new guitar company, the Caparison Guitars. Their new model, 27-fretter „The Caparison Horus“ made its debut in the same year, and more than ten years later, the collaboration with Chachamaru is still improving, as the model being the most famous company guitar.

Discography 
In 2002, Chachamaru released his solo album "Air," which involved him collaborating with Shusei Tsukamoto, Masafumi Nishida and Ryuichi Nishida, as well as You Kurosaki. Gackt Camui also took part as a guest vocalist.

Albums

References 

History of the first Japanese made Jackson guitars

External links 
 Caparison Guitars Profile

1960 births
Living people
Musicians from Kyoto
Japanese rock guitarists
Musicians from Kyoto Prefecture
20th-century Japanese guitarists
21st-century Japanese guitarists
Bukkyo University alumni